Sir Ernest Keith White CBE, MC (14 August 1892 – 1 August 1983) was an Australian timber merchant and political activist.

He was born at Gosford to timber contractor Robert John White and Bertha, née Davis. After attending Gosford Public School, he left at twelve and served in the junior cadets and worked for his father. He studied by correspondence with Sydney Technical College, qualifying through the Royal Sanitary Institute as a sanitary engineer. He worked as an inspector for Gosford and Moree shire councils before passing the local government and shire clerk's certificate. On 8 June 1915 he enlisted in the Australian Imperial Force. He married schoolteacher Pauline Marjory Mason, daughter of the mayor of Gosford, on 15 November 1915, and embarked as a second lieutenant in January 1916 as part of reinforcements for the 4th Battalion. He was wounded at Pozières in July and, after returning, rose to become the adjutant in July 1917. At Strazeele in April 1918 he reconnoitred the front line under heavy fire, winning the Military Cross and a mention in despatches. Promoted to captain in September, his appointment was terminated on 5 April 1919.

After the war, White returned to work with his father's timber business, moving the headquarters to Sydney. Based in Strathfield, he also bought a timber property near Gloucester and developed land at Terrigal, Wamberal and Forresters Beach. He owned several successful racehorses, which helped finance an opulent house built in 1936. He helped establish the British American Co-operation Movement for World Peace (which became the Australian-American Association) in July 1936, and served as federal and state president; he was significantly involved in the creation of the Australian-American Memorial in Canberra.

White was also politically active, mainly in anti-Labor circles. He tried to persuade Roden Cutler to head a National and Services Movement, but instead launched the Liberal Democratic Party on 16 April 1943 with Stanley S. Crick. The LDP had fraught relations with the United Australia Party and its New South Wales successor the Democratic Party, but it never won seats at federal or state level.

In December 1944 White was a founder of the Liberal Party of Australia and the LDP was dissolved in January 1945. Initially sitting on the provisional executive, he soon resigned in April 1945, standing as an independent for the federal seat of Warringah in 1954; this led to his expulsion from the Liberal Party.

He was appointed Officer of the Order of the British Empire in 1954, Commander in 1967 and knighted in 1969. He died in 1983 at North Sydney and was survived by his wife and two daughters, his son having been killed during World War II.

References

1892 births
1983 deaths
Australian activists
Liberal Party of Australia
Australian Commanders of the Order of the British Empire
Australian recipients of the Military Cross
Australian Knights Bachelor
20th-century Australian businesspeople